Ursina Jäggi  is a Swiss mountain bike orienteering competitor and World Champion. She won an individual gold medal at the 2012 World MTB Orienteering Championships,

References

Swiss orienteers
Female orienteers
Swiss female cyclists
Mountain bike orienteers
Year of birth missing (living people)
Living people
Place of birth missing (living people)
21st-century Swiss women